Shivalaya, means temple of Hindu deity Shiva, may also refer to:

 Shivalaya, Parbat, a former Village Development Committee in Parbat District, Gandaki Province, Nepal
 Shivalaya Rural Municipality, a Rural municipality in Jajarkot District, Karnali Province, Nepal
 Shivalaya Upazila, a sub-district in Manikganj District, Dhaka Division, Bangladesh
 Shivalya of Downtown Chicago, a Hindu temple in heart of downtown Chicago, Illinois, United States